St. Mark's Cross is a high cross and National Monument located in Blessington, County Wicklow, Ireland.

Location

History

St. Mark's Cross was erected in the 12th century next to a church and holy well in Burgage More. In the 19th century, it was also known as Saint Baoithin's Cross. The original site was submerged during the creation of Poulaphouca Reservoir, and the cross was moved to Burgage cemetery.

Description

The cross has an unpierced ring, unlike most Celtic crosses, and unusually long arms. There is a decorative boss in the centre of both faces. On the base of the cross is a weathered inscription.

References

National Monuments in County Wicklow
High crosses in the Republic of Ireland